Edward Telles is Distinguished Professor of Sociology at the University of California, Irvine and Director of the Center for Research on International Migration. He has authored several books and many articles, winning numerous prizes including the Distinguished Scholarly Publication Award from the American Sociological Association. He has been a leader in the study of race, color and ethnicity globally and throughout the Americas as well as on immigration and immigrant integration in the United States.

About 
Telles received his B.A. from Stanford University with a major in Anthropology, his M.A. from UCLA in Urban Planning and his Ph.D. from the University of Texas at Austin in Sociology. Prior to coming to UCI, he was professor at the University of California Santa Barbara, Princeton University and the University of California Los Angeles.  He was also Program Officer in Human Rights at the Ford Foundation in its Rio de Janeiro office.  At UCSB, he was founder and director of the Migration Initiative and at Princeton University, he was director of the Center for Migration and Development. He also served as Vice President of the American Sociological Association and was elected to the American Academy of Arts and Sciences and the Sociological Research Association. He has led numerous social survey studies including the multinational Project on Ethnicity and Race in Latin America (PERLA) and the multigenerational Mexican American Study Project (MASP). He has also been a senior Fulbright Fellow and a visiting scholar at the Russell Sage Foundation as well as visiting professor at Sciences Po, the University of Campinas and the University of Bahia.  Prior to pursuing academia, he was an English as a Second Language Instructor for adults and a Grants Management Specialist for the City of Los Angeles’s Community Development Department.

References

External links 
 Project on Ethnicity and Race in Latin America (PERLA).

1956 births
Living people
American sociologists
University of California, Santa Barbara faculty
University of California, Los Angeles faculty
Princeton University faculty
Writers from Whittier, California
21st-century American male writers
20th-century American male writers
University of Texas alumni
Fellows of the American Academy of Arts and Sciences
20th-century American writers